Hypotrachyna oprah is a species of foliose lichen in the family Parmeliaceae. Found in the United States in North Carolina, Alabama, and Florida, it was described as new to science in 2019 by lichenologists James Lendemer and Jessica Allen. It was named in honor of Oprah Winfrey. It contains the secondary chemical lichexanthone.

References

oprah
Lichen species
Lichens described in 2019
Lichens of the Southeastern United States
Fungi without expected TNC conservation status